Department of Higher Education (DHE) is created for administration and coordination of higher education institutions under the Ministry of Education (Myanmar). In 2020, there are 134 Universities and Colleges under this department.

History
DHE was formed as Universities Administrive Office in 1964.In 1972, it was changed as Department of High Education.According to People's Assembly Law No(4) Department of High Education was formed as Department of Higher Education.On 1 April 1998, it was divided into DHE (Upper Myanmar) in Mandalay and DHE (Lower Myanmar) in Yangon. On 1 April 2015, it was reformed as Department of Higher Education.

References

Government of Myanmar